Tomges (also Romanized as Tomegs; also known as Tonges and Tongsar) is a village in Dulab Rural District, Shahab District, Qeshm County, Hormozgan Province, Iran. At the 2006 census, its population was 162, in 34 families.

References 

Populated places in Qeshm County